Legend of the Moles: The Frozen Horror is a 2011 Chinese animated film.

See also
Legend of the Moles: The Treasure of Scylla (2012)
Legend of the Moles – The Magic Train Adventure (2015)

References

Chinese animated films
2011 animated films
2011 films